Acacia willingii is a shrub belonging to the genus Acacia and the subgenus Juliflorae. It is native to a small area in the Kimberley region of Western Australia.

Ecology

See also
List of Acacia species

References

willingii
Acacias of Western Australia
Taxa named by Bruce Maslin